Madame Irma is a 2006 comedy French film directed by Didier Bourdon and Yves Fajnberge and starring Didier Bourdon and Pascal Légitimus.

Plot
Francis, a recently laid-off CEO, takes up dressing up as a woman Romanian fortune-teller to earn money.

Cast
 Didier Bourdon : Francis / Irma
 Pascal Légitimus : Ludovic
 Arly Jover : Inès
 Catherine Mouchet : Brigitte
 Claire Nadeau : Nicole
 Jacques Herlin : Mr. Blanchard
 Julie Ferrier : The seer
 Nadège Beausson-Diagne : Sylvie
 Soko : The schoolgirl

References

External links
 

2006 films
French comedy films
Films directed by Didier Bourdon
2000s French films